WLSC (1240 AM) Tiger  Radio is a radio station broadcasting a classic country format. WLSC is licensed to serve the community of Loris, South Carolina, United States.  The station is currently owned by Banana Jack Murphy Productions, LLC and features programing from Premiere Networks, Clemson Tigers, Motor Racing Network, and Note Dame Fightin' Irish. In March, 2012, WLSC began broadcasting classic rock programming of QRockRadio, but switched to a talk format in November 2012.

History
WLSC signed on August 2, 1958 at 1570 AM, moving to 1240 in 1984.

The station was assigned the call letters WVSL on April Fools' Day 1984.  On New Year's Day 1986, the station changed its call sign to the current WLSC.

JARC Broadcasting owned WLSC from 1989 to 2007. The station played country music, bluegrass, and religious programming.

Banana Jack Murphy Productions LLC, a company formed by longtime Myrtle Beach radio personality, Banana Jack Murphy and his wife Barb Krumm, the marketing director for Ocean Lakes Family Campground in Myrtle Beach, SC purchased WLSC in the fall of 2007.  Murphy built new studios in downtown Loris at the intersection of Main and Broad Street.  The theatre style marquee sporting the station's call letters became an instant landmark.

WLSC aired country, bluegrass and religious programming until October 14, 2009 when the station switched to an oldies format and became known as Tiger Radio.  (WTGR, a popular Myrtle Beach station was also known as Tiger Radio and broadcast at 1520 AM before changing to WKZQ AM.)

In 2011, WLSC added the afternoon program "The Beach Bob Oldies Show", which originates from WOLT.  The Beach Bob Oldies Show would remain on WLSC until January 2012.

In April 2012, WLSC relocated to a new studio located in the Loris Chamber of Commerce building.  The theatre style marquee was removed and its whereabouts are unknown.

During the Spring and Summer of 2012, WLSC broadcast Q Rock Radio, a personality driven music format featuring past on air talent heard on WKZQ during the '70s and '80s.  (Q Rock Radio is now heard on WLVA, Lynchburg, VA at 580 AM and 106.5 FM.)

In August, 2012 WLSC became the new broadcast station for the popular weekly syndicated talk show, Whispers Paranormal Radio, hosted by Jordan Cline. It is syndicated worldwide via the UFO Paranormal Radio Network.

WLSC Tiger Radio changed to a talk format in November 2012.  The station features programming from the GCN Radio Network.  Alex Jones, Josh Tolley, Doug Stephan, Jason Lewis can now be heard on WLSC Tiger Radio.

In January 2013, Allen Smothers, The Bad Boy of Sports Radio debuted on WLSC Tiger Radio.  The Pressbox Radio Show hosted by Smothers can be heard weekdays 8 AM - 10 AM.

Since April 1, 2016, the "Down at the Barbershop" program has broadcast live from Loris Barber Shop from 10 A.M. until noon on Fridays, usually with a band playing. Eventually the show became available on live video, and fans watch all over the United States.

On August 3, 2018, Murphy announced plans for an FM signal on 106.7 FM. WLSC Tiger Radio can also be heard online.

John Boy and Billy began airing April 1, 2020 on 1240 AM and TigerRadio.com. The station is using crowdfunding to finance the translator which signed on August 8, 2020.

References

External links
 
 
 

LSC
Country radio stations in the United States